Marc Bell is an American financier and entrepreneur. He is the managing partner of Marc Bell Capital, a Boca Raton, Florida-based firm founded in 2003. He is also a producer of plays, musicals and movies.

Education
Bell graduated from Scarsdale High School in the Class of 1985. He later on earned his Bachelor of Science degree in accounting from Babson College and a Master of Science degree in real estate development and investment from New York University.

Career
Bell founded the web hosting company that eventually became Globix Corporation in 1989 at the age of 21 and served as its CEO and chairman of the board through the company's IPO in 1996
and into the dot-com bubble; as the company crashed along with the stock market in 2001, Bell was replaced as CEO.  Its market capitalization had fallen from almost $1 billion in 1999 to $5.87 million in 2002 when it went through Chapter 11 bankruptcy.

In 2001, he joined the Board of Trustees of New York University and Board of Overseers New York University School of Medicine.

Through his company Marc Bell Capital, Bell is an investor and partner in restaurants and nightclubs in New York City in ventures such as Artichoke Pizza and Lavo.

In 2004, Bell and a partner acquired Penthouse magazine for $52 million in a bankruptcy auction through a vehicle they called "Penthouse Media Group",  and in 2007 Penthouse Media Group acquired Various, which included networking site AdultFriendFinder.com for $500 million and Bell and his partner renamed the company Friend Finder Networks.  In the 2008 Bell attempted to enter the Las Vegas casino market and was interviewed by Robin Leach about his intentions; he brought Penthouse models with him to the interview.

Bell has produced musicals and plays such as Jersey Boys, Rock of Ages, The Wedding Singer, August: Osage County, and A Catered Affair. His production Jersey Boys won a Tony Award for Best Musical in 2006 and August: Osage County won Best Play in 2008.

In 2010 Bell, through Friend Finder Networks, tried to acquire Playboy Enterprises but was rebuffed after a $210 million bid.

The Friend Finder Networks company and the Penthouse magazine that it owned filed for bankruptcy protection on September 17, 2013. FriendFinder’s current common stock was wiped out and was no longer traded on the open market. In August 2013, FriendFinder's stock was delisted from Nasdaq because it consistently failed to trade for more than $1. That same year, Bell put his house in Boca Raton on the market for $35 million; it included a room modeled after the bridge of the Enterprise D from Star Trek: The Next Generation.

In February 2016, Penthouse Global Media – a new company headed by Penthouse Entertainment managing director Kelly Holland – acquired the Penthouse brand from FriendFinder Networks. Penthouse Global Media filed for Chapter 11 bankruptcy on January 11, 2018 to address debt-related issues. All assets of Penthouse Global Media, Inc. were bought out by WGCZ Ltd., operators of Xvideos, on June 4, 2018 after winning a bankruptcy auction for US$11.2 million; other companies, such as MindGeek, also participated in the auction.

He is a co-founder and the chief executive officer for Terran Orbital, a manufacturer of small satellites.

References

American chief executives of financial services companies
New York University Stern School of Business alumni
American theatre managers and producers
Living people
Year of birth missing (living people)
Place of birth missing (living people)
Babson College alumni
People from Scarsdale, New York
Penthouse (magazine) people